Hirosuke Tomizawa (born 16 April 1962) is a Japanese equestrian. He competed in two events at the 1992 Summer Olympics.

References

External links
 

1962 births
Living people
Japanese male equestrians
Olympic equestrians of Japan
Equestrians at the 1992 Summer Olympics
Sportspeople from Tokyo